Fort Clifton was a 19th-century fort in Kansas. It was built in August 1862 by settlers from the area to protect themselves from Native Americans. Near the old site of Clifton (west of the present town of Clifton at the border of Clay and Washington Counties), it was occupied until 1863.

Notes

References

Buildings and structures in Washington County, Kansas
Buildings and structures in Clay County, Kansas
Clifton
1859 establishments in Kansas Territory